Vyacheslav Ivanovich Starshinov (born May 6, 1940 in Moscow, Soviet Union) is a Russian former ice hockey player, coach and executive. Starshinov played in the Soviet Hockey League for HC Spartak Moscow, scoring 405 goals in 540 league games.  He led the league in goals in 1966-67, 1967–68, and 1968–69.  Starshinov also scored 149 goals in 182 international games with the Soviet national team, and was named top forward at the IIHF World Championships in 1965.  He also played for the Japanese hockey team Oji Eagles in 1976-1978.

He was inducted into the Russian and Soviet Hockey Hall of Fame in 1963 and the International Ice Hockey Federation Hall of Fame in 2007.

Career
Starshinov first played for Spartak in the 1957–58 season, earning a regular position in the 1958–59 season, in which he scored 12 goals. Starshinov would play for Spartak until 1972, when he would change over to coaching. His best season for Spartak was 1966–67, when he scored 47 goals and 9 assists for 56 points in 44 games. He first played for the national team in 1961 in the World Championships contributing six goals and three assists in seven games. He would be a member of the national team in World Championships until 1971. During this time the team won nine world championship tournaments and twice won the Olympic ice hockey tournament. In 1972, he turned to coaching Spartak, but before coaching, he played in the second game of the 1972 Summit Series versus the NHL professionals of Team Canada. In 1974–75, he returned to play for Spartak for one season before moving to Japan to play and coach Oji Eagles. In 1978, he returned to Spartak to play one final season, scoring 11 goals and seven assists in 37 games.

In 1979, Starshinov joined the Moscow Engineering Physics Institute, as head of the Department of Physical Education. He was named chairman of the Ice Hockey Federation of the Russian Federation in 1991. In 2002, Starshinov was named president of Spartak. In 2004, Starshinov was named president of the Association of Sports Industry (APSI).

Awards
 Order of the Red Banner of Labor (1965)
 "Badge of Honor" (1968), Medal of Honor (2010)
 Order "For Services to the Fatherland" III degree ( 26 April 2000 ) and IV ( 18 January 2007 ) - for outstanding contribution to the development of national sport
 Order of Friendship (1995, in connection with the 60th anniversary of the society "Spartacus")
 Olympic Order (2000).

Career statistics

International

References 

Sources:
 Hockey CCCP International
 IIHF Directorate Awards and Most Valuable Player

External links

1940 births
HC Spartak Moscow players
Ice hockey players at the 1964 Winter Olympics
Ice hockey players at the 1968 Winter Olympics
IIHF Hall of Fame inductees
Living people
Medalists at the 1964 Winter Olympics
Oji Eagles players
Olympic ice hockey players of the Soviet Union
Olympic gold medalists for the Soviet Union
Olympic medalists in ice hockey
Soviet ice hockey centres
Soviet expatriate ice hockey players
Ice hockey people from Moscow
Soviet expatriates in Japan